William George Price (15 June 1934 – 6 May 1999) was a British Labour politician.

Price was educated at the Forest of Dean Technical School and Gloucester Technical College. He was a journalist and secretary of the Central Midland National Union of Journalists.

Price was Member of Parliament for Rugby from 1966 to 1979, when he lost the seat to the Conservative Jim Pawsey.

References 
Times Guide to the House of Commons 1979

External links 
 

1934 births
1999 deaths
Labour Party (UK) MPs for English constituencies
UK MPs 1966–1970
UK MPs 1970–1974
UK MPs 1974
UK MPs 1974–1979